United Nations Security Council Resolution 1992, adopted unanimously on June 29, 2011, after recalling previous resolutions on the situation in Côte d'Ivoire (Ivory Coast), including resolutions 1933 (2010), 1942 (2010), 1951 (2010), 1962 (2010), 1967 (2011), 1968 (2011), 1975 (2011), 1980 (2011) and 1981 (2011), the Council extended the temporary re-deployment of United Nations troops and equipment from the United Nations Mission in Liberia (UNMIL) to the United Nations Operation in Côte d'Ivoire (UNOCI) until September 30, 2011.

Resolution

Observations
In the preamble of the resolution, the Council recalled co-operation agreements between United Nations peacekeeping missions in Resolution 1609 (2005) and Resolution 1938 (2010) and the role played by troops from UNMIL in the country.

Council members welcomed joint operations along the Liberia-Côte d'Ivoire border by both peacekeeping operations.

Acts
The Council, acting under Chapter VII of the United Nations Charter, renewed the temporary deployment of UNMIL troops until September 30, 2010. The temporary deployment consisted of three infantry companies, one aviation unit and three armed helicopters with crews. Meanwhile, the resolution also extended the temporary increase of 2,000 additional personnel to UNOCI until July 31, 2011. 

Finally, the Secretary-General Ban Ki-moon was to report by September 15, 2011 on inter-mission co-operation.

See also
 2010–2011 Ivorian crisis
 First Ivorian Civil War
 Ivorian parliamentary election, 2011
 Ivorian presidential election, 2010
 List of United Nations Security Council Resolutions 1901 to 2000 (2009 – 2011)
 Second Ivorian Civil War

References

External links

Text of the Resolution at undocs.org

 1992
2011 in Ivory Coast
 1992
June 2011 events